Eka Supria Atmaja (9 February 1973 – 11 July 2021) was an Indonesian politician. He was Regent of Bekasi from 2019 to 2021. He died of COVID-19 during the COVID-19 pandemic in Indonesia.

Biography
Eka Supria Atmojo was born in Waluya village, Bekasi on February 9, 1973. He graduated from Borobudur University in Jakarta in 1996 with a Bachelor of Laws.

He was elected to be village head of Waluya village for two terms running from 2001 to 2012. In 2014, he ran for membership in the Bekasi Regency regional council (DPRD) and was elected to the position of Chairman of the Bekasi Regency DPRD in 2014.

In 2017 he successfully ran for office for the position of deputy regent of Bekasi Regency along with Neneng Hassanah Yasin. When Yasin was arrested on bribery charges by the Corruption Eradication Commission (KPK) in October 2018, Atmaja was appointed in her place.
From 2019 until his death he was also chairman of the regional leadership council of the Golkar party.

Atmaja tested positive for COVID on July 1, 2021. He was initially treated at Jababeka hospital, Cikarang, in Bekasi but as it was over capacity he was sent to the Siloam Hospital in Kelapa Dua, Tangerang Regency, in western Java. He died there on July 11, 2021.

References

21st-century Indonesian politicians
1973 births
2021 deaths
Golkar politicians
Deaths from the COVID-19 pandemic in Indonesia
People from Bekasi
Sundanese people